The 2016–17 W-League season was the ninth season of the W-League, the Australian national women's association football competition.

Clubs

Stadia and locations

Personnel and kits

Transfers

Foreign players
 
The following do not fill a Visa position:
AAustralian citizens who have chosen to represent another national team;
RInjury Replacement Players, or National Team Replacement Players;

Regular season
The regular season commenced on 5 November 2016 and concluded on 29 January 2017.

League table

Fixtures

Finals series

Semi-finals

Grand final

Regular-season statistics

Top scorers

Own goals

Attendances

End-of-season awards
The following end of the season awards were announced at the 2016–17 Dolan Warren Awards night held at the Star Event Centre in Sydney on 1 May 2017.
 Julie Dolan Medal – Sam Kerr (Perth Glory)
 Penny Tanner Media MVP Award – Sam Kerr (Perth Glory)
 Young Player of the Year – Remy Siemsen (Sydney FC)
 Golden Boot Award – Ashleigh Sykes (Canberra United) (12 goals)
 Goalkeeper of the Year – Lydia Williams (Melbourne City)
 Coach of the Year – Bobby Despotovski (Perth Glory)
 Fair Play Award – Adelaide United
 Referee of the Year – Kate Jacewicz
 Goal of the Year – Sam Kerr (Perth Glory v Sydney FC, 11 December 2016)

See also

 2016–17 Adelaide United W-League season 
 2016–17 Brisbane Roar W-League season 
 2016–17 Canberra United W-League season 
 2016–17 Melbourne Victory W-League season 
 2016–17 Melbourne City W-League season
 2016–17 Newcastle Jets W-League season 
 2016–17 Perth Glory W-League season
 2016–17 Sydney FC W-League season 
 2016–17 Western Sydney Wanderers W-League season

References

 
Australia
2016–17 in Australian women's soccer
2016–17